Sathyan Anthikad is an Indian film director, screenwriter, and lyricist who predominantly works in Malayalam cinema. In a career spanning five decades he has directed more than 50 films, been the lyricist for 12 films and been the scriptwriter for 6 films.

Sathyan has created many critical and commercially successful films, especially when working with Sreenivasan as the scriptwriter. Sathyan made his debut with the 1982 film Kurukkante Kalyanam. The following is a complete list of works by Sathyan Anthikad.

Films

As director

As Assistant Director

As lyricist

References

Indian filmographies
Director filmographies